Brooklyn Institute may refer to

Brooklyn Institute of Arts and Sciences, now the Brooklyn Museum
Brooklyn Polytechnic Institute, now the Polytechnic Institute of New York University